The 1967–68 Indiana State Sycamores men's basketball team represented Indiana State University during the 1968 NCAA Division II men's basketball tournament. The Sycamores won 19 games in the regular season and were led by Jerry Newsom. He led the Sycamores to the national title game versus a George Tinsley-led Kentucky Wesleyan team, and ended the season as national runner-up with a record of 23–8.

Regular season
During the 1967–68 season, Indiana State finished with a non-conference record of 10–4; they placed 3rd in the Golden Spike Tournament hosted by Weber State (Utah); shared (with DePauw) the championship of the highly competitive Indiana Collegiate Conference (ICC) with a 9–3 record; spent eleven (of fourteen) weeks ranked in the top ten in the country for the season; unfortunately, their streak of 23 consecutive weeks in the AP Top Ten came to an end after dropping 3 out of 4 games in mid-season.  They closed out the season by winning 6 consecutive games to win the conference title and qualify for the NCAA tournament; they would eventually stretch their winning streak to 10 games until losing the NCAA title game. The Sycamores finished the regular season with a record of 23–8, 9–3.

Newsom received several honors at the end of regular season. He won the ICC Player of the Year, was named All-ICC for the third time and was a consensus All-American. The co-captain also led the conference in scoring with an average of 27.3; while leading the Trees in scoring in 28 games; he collected 14 double-doubles on the season and led the team in rebounding 17 times.

Newsome was not the only weapon for Stauffer's Sycamores; Rich Mason led the conference in rebounding, grabbing an average of 13 per game and was named 1st Team All-Conference. Mike Copper, the other co-captain was named Honorable Mention All-Conference and Fred Hardman was named to the All-NCAA tournament team.

Roster
The Sycamores were led by Newsom, the ICC Player of the Year, and his 26.1 scoring average. He was followed by Mike Copper's 17.8 average. The starting lineup also included Fred Hardman, Rich Mason and Steve Hollenbeck. Howard Humes and Mike Phillips were key reserves. The remainder of the roster consisted of Dan Chitwood, Ken Hass, John McIntire, Jerry Novak, Jim Waldrip, Don Weirich and Tom Zellers.

Schedule and results

|-
!colspan=8 style=| Regular season
|-

NCAA basketball tournament
The top seed in the NCAA Great Lakes Regional was awarded to the Sycamores. In the opener, the Trees sprinted past #4 seed South Dakota State, the final game of the regional tournament was against heated-rival & #2 seed Illinois State with a berth in the Final Four on the line. The Sycamores won by 5, and returned to a National Tournament Finals for the first time in 15 seasons (1953 NAIA Tournament).

In Evansville, site of the NCAA Finals, the Sycamores dominated the Rebels of Nevada Southern, winning by 19; they cruised past Trinity of Texas advancing to the Championship game vs. Kentucky Wesleyan College, which was led by junior George Tinsley. Playing in a standing room only arena, they were unable to maintain their halftime lead and Kentucky Wesleyan defeated Indiana State 63–52. Newsom was voted Most Outstanding Player of the Final Four.  Fred Hardman was also named to the All-Tourney team after posting a 16-point, 9-rebound title game.

Elite Eight
Indiana State 94, Nevada Southern 75
National Semi-Finals
Indiana State 77, Trinity (TX) 67
National Championship Game
Kentucky Wesleyan 63, Indiana State 52

Awards and honors
Mike Copper – All-Indiana Collegiate Conference (Honorable Mention)
Fred Hardman – NCAA Tournament All-Tourney Team
Rich Mason – All-Indiana Collegiate Conference (First Team)
Jerry Newsom – Consensus All-American (AP, UPI, and Coaches)
Jerry Newsom – Indiana Collegiate Conference Most Valuable Player
Jerry Newsom – All-Indiana Collegiate Conference (First Team)
Jerry Newsom – NCAA Tournament Most Outstanding Player Award; NCAA Tournament All-Tourney Team

In 2005, the entire team was inducted into the Indiana State University Athletic Hall of Fame; Jerry Newsom was inducted as an individual in 1984.

Jerry Newsom (1997), Head Coach Gordon Stauffer (2004), Assistant Coach Mel Garland (1993) Steve Hollenbeck (2005) and Mike Copper (2010) were inducted into the Indiana Basketball Hall of Fame.

References

Indiana State Sycamores men's basketball seasons
Indiana State Sycamores men's basketball
Indiana State Sycamores men's basketball
Indiana State